Ruphin Menakely (born 15 September 1975) is a retired Malagasy football striker.

International goals

References

1975 births
Living people
Malagasy footballers
Madagascar international footballers
AS Excelsior players
Association football forwards
Malagasy expatriate footballers
Expatriate footballers in Réunion
Malagasy expatriate sportspeople in Réunion